PC Music Volume 1 is the first compilation album by British record label PC Music, released on 2 May 2015 as a paid download. The album consists of remastered versions of the label's earlier work.

Background and composition
Because the label releases most of its work for free, "Every Night" by Hannah Diamond had been the only song available for purchase. PC Music Volume 1 includes one new track—"USA" by GFOTY, which had previously appeared on her Secret Mix.

The label's musical acts function more as avatars than as themselves. The songs carry themes of escaping physical life, with an artificial quality that intensifies feelings of longing. PC Music often uses the motif of eternity, and several of the songs use together/forever rhymes. The album's digital take on dance-pop music favours retrofuturistic Eurodance and high-pitched, cutesy female vocals. Its often minimalist production produces frenetic, distorted mixes.

Critical reception

PC Music Volume 1 garnered polarising yet mostly positive reviews from critics. As of June 2015, the album holds an aggregate 73 out of 100 based on eight reviews. Consequence of Sound wrote that the album "leaves space for agnosticism about whether it's all a joke or a deathly serious artistic maneuver." Spin magazine regretted the omission of some of the label's more satirical work, but it continued that "at almost 30 minutes exactly, PC Music Volume 1 quits while it's ahead." Pitchfork described the album as a "rapturous, nightmarish cartoon corpus" that showcases "a meaningful spectrum of approaches within the PC Music ethos".

In more mixed reviews, Rolling Stone's Jon Dolan said that with the exception of A. G. Cook's "Beautiful", "the songs are only as good as the concept, which wears thin fast." A review published in The Wire described the song as "glossy, giddy, sparkly and shallow", much like music that would fitting wealthy private school teenaged student's sleepover. Xavier Boucherat described how he scored the album on a 20-point scale in his review for the magazine Crack: "2 points for Danny 'dick in the pants' Harle for having arguably the funniest moniker out, 2 for those 'Red Bull own PC Music' rumours that you yourselves probably started, and 6 for GFOTY who weirdly reminds me of my mum."

PC Music Volume 1 was ranked the 36th best album of 2015 by Time Out London, the 7th best experimental album by PopMatters, and made Spin and Flavorwires lists of the best albums of the first half of 2015.

Track listing

References

External links
 
 

2015 compilation albums
Bubblegum pop compilation albums
Compilation albums by English artists
Dance-pop albums by English artists
Dance-pop compilation albums
Electronic compilation albums
Eurodance compilation albums
Experimental music compilation albums
Grime music albums
PC Music compilation albums
Europop albums
Europop compilation albums
Record label compilation albums
Albums produced by A. G. Cook